Wii Speak is a microphone accessory for Nintendo's Wii home video game console. Connected to the console via USB, the device can be placed near the video display, allowing voice chat to be conducted with the entire room and as it is placed on top of the sensor bar. The device features an LED to indicate when the microphone is active. Wii Speak was announced at Nintendo's 2008 E3 media briefing. It was released separately and bundled with Animal Crossing: City Folk on November 16, 2008, in North America, and was released on December 5, 2008, in Europe.

The Wii Speak accessory is succeeded by the embedded microphone on the Wii U's GamePad controller. Nevertheless, the Wii Speak hardware is still compatible with the Wii U.

Design

According to Shigeru Miyamoto, the microphone is designed to "clearly capture many different voices being spoken in a room at the same time and convey that over the Internet." Addressing concerns over background noise due to the placement of the microphone near a television set, Animal Crossing: City Folk producer Katsuya Eguchi states that the device is designed to filter out video game sound from the audio speakers. Miyamoto notes that the quality of the noise filtering functionality in the Wii Speak is "very good", which may be contributing to the cost of the device. A switch was originally planned, but the microphone now turns on only when a compatible game wants access to it.

Software
At E3, when asked why the device would not be bundled with City Folk, Nintendo senior managing director Shigeru Miyamoto replied that cost was the factor behind the decision, adding that some users may prefer playing the game without a microphone, and that others may want to use Wii Speak who are not interested in buying City Folk. In contrast with previous statements, Nintendo later revealed that a bundle of Wii Speak and City Folk would also be released. The bundle was a limited edition, released the same day as the standalone products.

Wii Speak Channel

On October 2, 2008, Nintendo announced that Wii Speak would have its own Wii Channel. The Wii Speak Channel can be unlocked for download by a 16-digit Wii Download Ticket, included with the Wii Speak package upon purchase. Those who enter the 16-digit code on the Wii Shop Channel are allowed to download the Wii Speak Channel, which was launched on December 5, 2008. If for any reason, the download ticket was lost or used on another Wii, users could obtain a new download ticket via email from Nintendo. Prior to the launch, customers could download the Wii Speak Channel Download Assistant, a channel which gave information about the release of the Wii Speak Channel. After the release, the Download Assistant updated itself into the actual channel.

The channel allows users to chat in one of four rooms with Wii Friends using Wii Speak online. There is no limit to the number of people that can be in each room. Each user will be represented by their Mii, which will lip sync to their spoken words. In addition, users will also be able to leave audio messages on the Wii message board for other users, as well as make audio captions for their stored photos. Users can also share photo slideshows and comment on them.

The Wii Speak channel is available on the Wii U's "Wii Mode", however, it has no use, as the Wii U's Wii Mode has no friend code.  However, the Wii Speak peripheral itself does function on the Wii U with games that support it. The Wii Speak channel is no longer available for download due to being discontinued and download codes that are used just give an error message about the channel being no longer available.

The Wii Speak Channel ceased functionality after May 20, 2014 since the free Nintendo Wi-Fi Connection service was discontinued. The Wii Speak Channel is succeeded by the Wii U Chat video chat app for the Wii U.

Compatible games

References

Products introduced in 2008
Speak

fr:Wii#Wii Speak